Awa Sene (born 24 July 1994) is a French hurdler and pentathlete who competes in international elite events. She is a 2018 French champion in the 100 metre hurdles and her highest achievement is reaching fourth at the event in the 2013 European U20 Athletics Championships in Rieti.

References

1994 births
Living people
Sportspeople from Besançon
French female hurdlers
French pentathletes
Senegalese emigrants to France